The Mis-Adventures of Awkward Black Girl (often simply referred to as Awkward Black Girl) is an American comedy web series created by and starring Issa Rae. It premiered on a dedicated YouTube channel on February 3, 2011. The show follows the life of J as she interacts with co-workers and love interests who place her in uncomfortable situations. The story is told through first-person narrative as J usually reveals how she feels about her circumstances through voice-over or dream sequence.

Critics have praised Awkward Black Girl for its witty humor and unique, realistic portrayal of African-American women. The New York Times critic Jon Caramica describes the show as “full of sharp, pointillist humor that’s extremely refreshing.” The series won a Shorty Award for Best Web Series in 2012.

In 2016, the series was adapted into the HBO series Insecure, which ended in 2021.

History
Issa Rae was inspired to create The Mis-Adventures of Awkward Black Girl in January 2009 while working at New Federal Theatre in New York City. Experiencing difficulty in meeting people in an unfamiliar place, Issa Rae decided that it would be entertaining to depict uncomfortable scenarios one may experience when dealing with others.  Neglecting the idea for two years, Issa Rae's interest was renewed after reading an article by Leslie Pitterson pointing out the absence of black female nerd characters on screen. She then called on friends to shoot the first episode. The series went viral through word of mouth, blog posts, and social media, which resulted in further media coverage. In an effort to fund the rest of the season, Issa Rae and producer Tracy Oliver decided to raise money for the series through Kickstarter. On August 11, 2011, they were awarded $56,269 from 1,960 donations. Due to the popularity of the series, Issa Rae has been interviewed by Fredricka Whitfield for CNN Newsroom, Michel Martin for Tell Me More, Associated Press and other media outlets.

The second season of Awkward Black Girl aired on Pharrell Williams's i am OTHER in 2012-2013.

Characters and cast

 J is the self-described "awkward and black" passive-aggressive main character who works at a call center for weight-loss pill company, Gutbusters. Throughout the series J has to deal with rival, co-worker Nina, and being in love with two men White J and Fred. As a means of dealing with the stresses of her love-life and work environment, J composes and performs rap lyrics sometimes with friend, CeCe. J is portrayed by Issa Rae, creator, actress, writer, and director.
 CeCe is the best friend/sidekick and co-worker of J who works in human resources.  Typically excited, CeCe offers J fallible advice that usually leads J into trouble. CeCe is portrayed by actress and writer Sujata Day.
 Nina is the primary antagonist and co-worker of J. She makes it her duty to stir up trouble for J and mock her. She is promoted by Boss Lady over J and appears to have dated J's love interest, Fred. Nina is portrayed by actress, writer, and producer Tracy Oliver.
 Boss Lady is J's superior and an antagonist of J. She is apparently unaware of her racial insensitivity. Boss Lady is portrayed by actress and writer, Hanna.
 Fred is J's initial love interest and co-worker. Fred is portrayed by actor Madison T. Shockley III.
 A is an antagonist and nerdy co-worker of J. He is introduced in the series as her "awkward mistake" after she slept with him at a company holiday party. A is portrayed by actor and dancer Andrew Allan James.
 Patty is an antagonist of J and other Gutbusters employees. She is commonly referred to as Germy Patty because she is always sick and perpetually carrying tissues. Patty continues to appear at the Gutbusters office and company social events, even after being fired by Boss Lady. Patty is portrayed by actress Kiki Harris.
 Amir is an antagonist of J and other Gutbusters employees. He makes racially insensitive jokes at the expense of his co-workers. Amir is portrayed by actor and producer, Fahad.
 Darius is an antagonist and co-worker of J.  He is commonly referred to as "Baby Voice Darius". Darius speaks low enough that others find him inaudible except for long-time friend, Fred. He has a very loud laugh that is rarely heard. Darius is portrayed by actor Tristen Winger.
 Dolores Clarence is a co-worker and antagonist of J and CeCe. She works in human resources and changes her name to Sister Mary after becoming a born-again Christian. Dolores is portrayed by actress Leah A. Williams
 Jesus is J's superior and an antagonist of J. The former sensitivity trainer, he replaces Boss Lady as manager after she is called to corporate. He is portrayed by actor Michael Ruesga.
 White Jay is a love interest of J who works as an anger management counselor. He is outwardly off-beat and appears to share the same awkward disposition as J. His introduction creates a love triangle between him, J and Fred, however she chooses him in the end. White Jay is portrayed by actor Lyman Johnson.
 Jerry is an overly excited temporary worker at Gutbusters. He is portrayed by actor Ricky Woznichak.
 D is J's former boyfriend. D is played by actor Mike Danger.

Episodes

Season 1 (2011–12)

Season 2 (2012–13)

Reception
In 2012, Rae was featured in the esteemed Forbes 30 Under 30 Entertainment List for her work with Awkward Black Girl.  The show also won the Shorty Award for Best Web Series.

Critics have praised Awkward Black Girl for its witty humor and unique, realistic portrayal of African-American women. The New York Times critic Jon Caramica describes the show as “full of sharp, pointillist humor that’s extremely refreshing.” On her site beyondblackwhite.com, Christelyn Karazin wrote, “Aren't you tired of seeing black women look like idiots on television? Here's a girl—whom I suspect is a lot like the women who read this blog—quirky, funny, a little unsure of herself, rocks her hair natural and is beautifully brown skinned.” 

Erin Stegeman of The Tangled Web praises Awkward Black Girl for defying stereotypes of African American women and being “an uber-relatable slice of life, narrated by J’s inner-ramblings that run through any awkward person’s mind.”

See also
 Insecure (TV series)

References

External links
 
 
 

2011 web series debuts
American comedy web series
Kickstarter-funded web series
2010s YouTube series
Shorty Award winners